Velvet (stylized in all caps) is the fourth studio album by American singer Adam Lambert, released through More Is More and Empire Distribution on March 20, 2020. It features the singles "Feel Something", "New Eyes", "Comin in Hot", "Superpower", and "Roses" with Nile Rodgers, as well as all the tracks featured on the Velvet: Side A EP, released in September 2019. Lambert was scheduled to promote the album with five appearances at the Venetian Las Vegas on April 18, 19, 22, 24 and 25 (postponed due to the COVID-19 pandemic) before embarking on a European tour from August to September 2020.

Background
Lambert described the album as "thirteen slinky numbers to catch a vibe to".

Critical reception 

Velvet received highly positive reviews from critics, with some calling it Lambert's best work to date. The album has a score of 84 on Metacritic indicating "universal acclaim." Mike Wass of Idolator described Velvets sound as a "wild ride that incorporates everything from disco to glam rock", while Stephen Daw of Billboard stated that the record was "continuing in the same vein of late '60s funk rock that's fueled his latest releases". Writing for AllMusic, Matt Collar called the album a "new and delightfully retro direction", as well as a "dazzling, glitter-dipped exercise in '70s disco-era funk, rock, and soul". A.D. Amorosi of Variety praised the record, writing "the 38-year-old out singer goes for something less glamorously amorously entertaining and more grimily soulful and sleekly funky than we’re used to hearing from him" and "Adam Lambert has made "Velvet" a testament to finding his way, personally and professionally, in what is his most accomplished solo work to date".

Track listing

Notes
 "Love Dont" is sometimes written as "Love Don't", with an apostrophe.

Charts

References

2020 albums
Adam Lambert albums
Empire Distribution albums
Albums produced by Fred Ball (producer)
Albums produced by Tommy English (producer)
Albums produced by Steve Booker (producer)
Albums produced by Butch Walker